Miss France 2009, the 62nd edition of the Miss France pageant, was held in Puy du Fou, Pays de la Loire on December 6, 2008. 

It was the first time that the pageant took place in Puy du Fou and the Pays de la Loire region.

The ceremony was held at TF1, and was presented by Jean-Pierre Foucault and the national director Sylvie Tellier.

Chloé Mortaud of Albigeois Midi-Pyrénées  was crowned Miss France 2009 by the outgoing title-holder Valérie Bègue of Réunion, Miss France 2008. She will represent France at Miss World 2009 where she has finished 3rd runner-up. She also placed in top 11 in Miss Universe 2009.

Results

Special awards

Candidates

Judges

Notes about the contestants
Miss Albigeois Midi-Pyrenees, Chloé Mortaud, is American.   
Miss Brittany, Bianca Taillard, has got Malagasy origins.
Miss Flandre, Éméné Nyamé, has got Algerian and Cameroonian origins.  
Miss Languedoc-Roussillon, Cindy Filipiak, has many titles : 1st runner-up of Miss Montpellier 2006, 2nd runner-up of Miss Canton of Pigan, 1st runner-up of Miss Hérault 2006, Miss Perolls 2007 and Miss Hérault 2007.
Miss Martinique, Laura Fidi, has got Senegalese origins. 
Miss New Caledonia, Aurélia Morelli, has got Corsican, Arabic, Tahitian and Japanese origins. 
Miss Paris, Sarah Barzyk, is the daughter of Patricia Barzyk, Miss France 1980 and 1st runner-up of Miss World 1980.
Miss Franche-Comté, Johanne Kervella, given favorite for this election is not among the 12 semifinalists because it was not the regulatory size (1.70M)

Notes about the placements
Albigeois Midi-Pyrénées wins for the first time ever the Miss France pageant.
Réunion is placed for five consecutive year.
Pays de Loire and Rhône-Alpes is placed for third consecutive year.
Guadeloupe is placed for second consecutive year.
Poitou-Charentes is placed for the first time since the Miss France 1998 pageant.
Mayotte is placed for the first time since the Miss France 2002 pageant.
Brittany is placed for the first time since the Miss France 2004 pageant.
Normandy and Lorraine are placed for the first time since the Miss France 2005 pageant.
Berry Loire Valley and Limousin are placed for the first time since the Miss France 2007 pageant.
First qualification of Albigeois Midi-Pyrénées for her first participation.

Crossovers 
Contestants who previously competed or will be competing at international beauty pageants:

Miss Universe
2009:  Albigeois Midi-Pyrénées - Chloé Mortaud (Top 10)
 (Nassau)

Miss Model of the World
2009:  Flandre - Éméné Nyamé (Winner)
 (Shenzhen)

Miss International
2009:  Poitou Charentes - Mathilde Muller
 (Chengdu)

Miss World
2009:  Albigeois Midi-Pyrénées - Chloé Mortaud (3rd Runner-up)
 (Johannesburg)

References

External links
Official Website

Miss France
2008 in France
2008 beauty pageants
Pays de la Loire
December 2008 events in France